Kurihara is a Japanese surname. Notable people with the surname include:

Akihiro Kurihara (born 1985), Japanese football player
Ayane Kurihara (born 1989), Japanese badminton player
Ayumi Kurihara (born 1984), joshi puroresu wrestler.
Harumi Kurihara (born 1947), Japanese celebrity homemaker and television personality
Hiroko Kurihara, American designer and activist 
Hitomi Kurihara (born 1981), Japanese actress
Joseph Kurihara (1895–1965), Japanese American internee who renounced U.S. citizenship under the Renunciation Act of 1944 in protest of the internment
Katsushi Kurihara (born 1977), Japanese football player
Kazuaki Kurihara (born 1979), Japanese instructor of Shotokan karate
Keisuke Kurihara (born 1973), Japanese football player and manager
Keisuke Kurihara (motorcyclist) (born 1997), Japanese motorcycle racer
Kenneth K. Kurihara, Japanese-American professor of economic theory
Kenta Kurihara (born 1982), Japanese batting coach
Koji Kurihara (born 1964), Japanese sprinter
Komaki Kurihara (born 1945), Japanese stage and film actress
Louis Kurihara (born 1994), Japanese fashion model, TV personality and actor 
Megumi Kurihara (born 1984), Japanese volleyball player
Michio Kurihara (born 1961), Japanese guitarist
Mika Kurihara (born 1989), Japanese basketball player
Ryoya Kurihara (born 1996), Japanese baseball player
Sadako Kurihara (1913–2005), Japanese poet
Shigeru Kurihara (born 1970), Japanese gymnast
Takashi Kurihara (born 1947) Japanese golfer
Thomas Kurihara (1885–1926), Japanese actor and film director
Toru Kurihara (born 1978), Japanese rugby union player
Yasuhide Kurihara (1908–1936), Imperial Japanese Army officer who was a conspirator in the February 26 Incident in 1936
Yuzo Kurihara (born 1983), Japanese football player

See also
Kurihara (disambiguation)

Japanese-language surnames